Steven Lugsden (born 10 July 1976 in Gateshead, County Durham) is an English cricketer. Lugsden is a right-handed batsman who is a right-arm fast-medium bowler.

He started playing career at Durham, making his debut in 1993. He made sporadic appearances for the team over the following five years before being released by Durham at the conclusion of the 1998 campaign. For the 1999 season Lugsden was signed by Hampshire, playing just twice for the club before being released at the end of the season.

On the 17th July 2022 Lugsden got his first career 100 while playing for Gateshead Fell. Steven finished not out on 108.

External links
Steve Lugsden on Cricinfo
Steve Lugsden on CricketArchive

1976 births
Living people
Cricketers from Gateshead
English cricketers
Durham cricketers
Hampshire cricketers